Laura Weightman (born 1 July 1991) is a British middle-distance runner who competes in the 1500 metres and 5000 metres. She reached the 1500 metres final at the 2012 London Olympics and the 2016 Rio Olympics. She won a silver medal at the 2014 Commonwealth Games and bronze medals at the 2014 and 2018 European Championships. She also won a bronze medal in the 5000 metres at the 2018 Commonwealth Games. Her personal best in the mile of 4:17.60 in 2019 ranks her in the world all-time top 25.

Early life and education
Weightman was born on 1 July 1991 in Alnwick, Northumberland, England, where she was educated at The Duchess's Community High School. In May 2013, she graduated with a Sport and Exercise Science degree from Leeds Metropolitan University. She currently lives in Leeds where she trains full-time.

Career
Weightman finished sixth in the 1500 metres final at the 2010 IAAF World Junior Championships in Athletics and ended the season with a 1500m best of 4:09.60. She improved this to 4:07.94 in 2011.

At the 2012 Olympic Games in London, Weightman ran a personal best of 4:02.99 in the 1500 metres semi-finals, and went on to finish ninth in the final. In 2013, she ran a 3000 metres best of 8:43.46 in Stretford. She further improved her 1500 metres best to 4:00.17 on 5 July 2014 at the Paris Diamond League. She won a silver medal at the 2014 Commonwealth Games in Glasgow and a bronze medal at the 2014 European Championships in Zurich.

Weightman reached her second Olympic final in 2016, finishing 11th at the Olympic Games in Rio. She finished sixth in the 1500m final at the 2017 World Championships in London. She won bronze medals in the 5000 metres at the 2018 Commonwealth Games and in the 1500m at the 2018 European Championships in Berlin. After running a personal best of 4:20.49 for the mile in 2018, she improved to 4:17.60 in 2019, a time that moved her into the world all-time top 25.

Weightman is coached by Steve Cram, former world-record holder in the 1500m and the mile. She was previously coached by Mike Bateman from Morpeth Harriers.

She became a five times British champion when winning the 1500 metres event at the 2020 British Athletics Championships in a time of 4 min 09.76 secs.

Statistics

Competition record

Personal bests

All information taken from IAAF profile.

References

External links

 

Living people
1991 births
People from Alnwick
Sportspeople from Northumberland
English female middle-distance runners
British female middle-distance runners
Olympic female middle-distance runners
Olympic athletes of Great Britain
Athletes (track and field) at the 2012 Summer Olympics
Athletes (track and field) at the 2016 Summer Olympics
Commonwealth Games silver medallists for England
Commonwealth Games medallists in athletics
Athletes (track and field) at the 2014 Commonwealth Games
Athletes (track and field) at the 2018 Commonwealth Games
World Athletics Championships athletes for Great Britain
European Athletics Championships medalists
British Athletics Championships winners
Alumni of Leeds Beckett University
Medallists at the 2014 Commonwealth Games
Medallists at the 2018 Commonwealth Games